Vicente Fernández (1940–2021) was a Mexican singer, actor and film producer.

Vicente Fernández may also refer to:

 Vicente Fernández (golfer) (born 1946), Argentine golfer
 Vicente Fernández (Chilean footballer) (Vicente Fernández Godoy, born 1999)
 Vicente (footballer, born 1975) (Vicente Fernández Pujante), Spanish footballer